The Tompo is a river in the Sakha Republic (Yakutia), Russia, a right tributary of the Aldan, part of the Lena basin. River Tompo gives its name to the Tompo District. It flows across desolate regions, Topolinoye being the only inhabited place in the long course of the river.

The Tompo is not navigable.

Course
The Tompo originates in the southern slopes of the Elgi Plateau.

In its uppermost course the Tompo runs roughly northward along the northern side of the Suntar-Khayata mountains; after roughly  it turns and follows a generally westward direction for about  through the southern part of the Elgi Plateau. After the mouth of the Menkule River, it emerges from the mountains and, flowing in a southwesterly direction, enters the eastern side of the Central Yakutian Plain, where its valley becomes very wide and swampy, its riverbed dividing into lazily-flowing arms as the speed of the flow decreases. Finally the Tompo meets the right bank of the Aldan River, opposite Megino-Aldan village, upstream of the mouth of the Baray.

Tributaries

See also
List of rivers of Russia
Yana-Oymyakon Highlands§Hydrography

References

Rivers of the Sakha Republic
Verkhoyansk Range
Central Yakutian Lowland
Suntar-Khayata